The Giver is a 2014 American dystopian drama film directed by Phillip Noyce and starring Jeff Bridges, Brenton Thwaites, Odeya Rush, Meryl Streep, Alexander Skarsgård, Katie Holmes, Cameron Monaghan, Taylor Swift, and Emma Tremblay. The film is based on the 1993 young adult novel of the same name by Lois Lowry.  The Giver premiered on August 11, 2014, and was released theatrically in the United States on August 15, 2014. It grossed $67 million on a $25 million budget and received a People's Choice Award nomination for "Favorite Dramatic Movie".

Plot

Following a calamity referred to as "the Ruin", society has been reorganized, taking away any sense of emotion, good or bad. Babies are brought into being through genetic engineering, and sexual desire is chemically suppressed. All memories of the past are held by one person, the Receiver of Memory, to shield the rest of the community. Receiver of
Memory and his protégé are the only people able to see in color, which is otherwise eliminated from the community to prevent envy. The community is ruled by elders, including the Chief Elder.
Jonas is an 18-year-old boy whose best friends are Asher and Fiona. On graduation day, Jonas is told that he will become the next Receiver of Memory and will progressively receive memories of history from his predecessor, the Giver. During his training with the Giver, Jonas gradually learns about the past and about joy, pain, death, and love. He stops taking his daily injections (which stop him from dreaming and thinking about Fiona, for whom he has feelings) and begins to experience emotion. Those who leave the community are said to have been "released to Elsewhere", but Jonas learns that to be a euphemism for murder by lethal injection. Jonas also learns that the Giver's daughter, Rosemary, had preceded Jonas as Receiver of Memory. When she began her training, however, Rosemary became so distraught from the memories that she received that she asked to be "released".

Jonas learned the memories received from the Giver and accidentally shares his memories with a baby, Gabriel, who was brought home by his father. He develops a close relationship with Gabriel upon discovering that they share a birthmark, the mark of a potential Receiver of Memory, and both can see in color.

Appalled by the deception of his community and the Elders' disregard for human life, Jonas comes to believe that everyone should have memories of the past. Eventually, the Giver and Jonas decide that the only way to help the community is for Jonas to travel past the border of their land to "Elsewhere". Doing so would release memories and color back into the community. When Jonas tries to leave his neighborhood, he encounters Asher, who tries to stop Jonas but is punched by Jonas. Jonas retrieves Gabriel, who is to be "released" for having failed to meet a developmental marker, at the Nurturing Center.

Meanwhile, Jonas' mother and Asher go to the Chief Elder to say that Jonas is missing. Jonas steals a motorcycle and drives away with Gabriel. Asher is assigned by the Chief Elder to use a drone to find Jonas and "take" him. When Asher finds Jonas and Gabriel in the desert, Jonas beseeches Asher to trust him and to let them go. Instead, Asher captures them with the drone but sets them free by dropping them into a river. When he is questioned by the Chief Elder, Asher lies and says that he has followed her orders.

Fiona is condemned to be "released" for helping Jonas. Just as she is about to be "released" by Jonas' father, the Giver tries to persuade the Chief Elder that the Elders should free the community. Unmoved by the Giver's arguments, the Chief Elder asserts that freedom is a bad idea because when they are left to their own devices, people make bad choices.

Jonas and Gabriel enter a snowy area. Jonas falls to the ground and is overcome by the cold weather. However, he sees a sled like the one that he rode in a memory that he had received from the Giver. Jonas and Gabriel ride the sled downhill and cross the border into Elsewhere, which frees their community and also saves Fiona's life as Jonas' father stops short of "releasing" her upon realizing his intentions. Jonas realizes that he has succeeded in his quest.

Cast

Production

Jeff Bridges initially wanted to film the movie in the mid-1990s, and a script was written by 1998. Various barriers marred the production of the film,  including when Warner Bros. bought the rights in 2007. The rights then ended up at The Weinstein Company and Walden Media.

Bridges originally intended that his own father, Lloyd Bridges, would play the title character, The Giver, but he died in 1998.

Principal photography began on October 7, 2013 in Cape Town and Johannesburg. Meryl Streep had some of her scenes shot in England, where she also filmed Rob Marshall's Into the Woods, before doing additional filming two months later in Paarl, a town near Cape Town. The filming was completed on February 13, 2014 in Utah.

Music

The score for The Giver was composed by Marco Beltrami. The song "Ordinary Human" by OneRepublic was featured in the movie. The film also features Tori Kelly's "Silent". The soundtrack was released on August 5, 2014 by Interscope Records.

Release
On July 11, 2014, it was announced that The Weinstein Company and Walden Media would be teaming up with Fathom Events to stream the red carpet premiere to more than 250 theaters in the US on August 11, four days before its official release. Ziegfeld Theatre hosted the film's premiere in New York City.  It grossed $45.1 million in North America and $21.9 million overseas for a worldwide total of $67 million, against a production budget of $25 million. The film earned $4.7 million on its opening day. In its opening weekend, the film grossed $12.3 million, finishing in 5th place at the box office.

Reception
On Rotten Tomatoes, the film has an approval rating of 35% based on 171 reviews and an average rating of 5.3/10. The site's critical consensus reads, "Phillip Noyce directs The Giver with visual grace, but the movie doesn't dig deep enough into the classic source material's thought-provoking ideas." On Metacritic, the film holds a score of 47 out of 100 based on 33 critics, indicating "mixed or average reviews". Richard Roeper gave the film a "C" and stated that "the magic [of the novel] gets lost in translation".

Accolades

See also
 Æon Flux
 List of films featuring drones
 Logan's Run

References

External links
 
 
 
 
 

2014 films
2010s science fiction drama films
American science fiction drama films
Films directed by Phillip Noyce
American dystopian films
Films about memory
Films set in the 2040s
Films based on American novels
Films based on science fiction novels
Films scored by Marco Beltrami
Films shot in England
Films shot in Gauteng
Films shot in the Western Cape
Films shot in Utah
Walden Media films
Social science fiction films
2010s English-language films
2010s American films